Omar Brian Andrada (born 22 June 1997) is an Argentine professional footballer who plays as a forward for San Martín de Tucumán, on loan from Gimnasia Mendoza.

Career
La Plata's Gimnasia y Esgrima were the opening club of Andrada's senior career. Pedro Troglio promoted the forward into his squad during the 2015 Primera División, with Andrada making his professional bow on 11 April in a 4–1 win over Aldosivi; having been an unused substitute on two previous occasions. Despite remaining for three total seasons, he made just one more appearance for them; a four-minute cameo versus Sarmiento in February 2016. On 4 January 2018, Andrada joined Ferro Carril Oeste of Torneo Federal A. His first appearances came later that month over two legs in the Copa Argentina against Independiente.

August 2018 saw Andrada complete a move to Primera B Nacional side Gimnasia y Esgrima; a team located in Mendoza. On 1 June 2022, Andrada joined San Martín de Tucumán on loan until the end of 2023.

Career statistics
.

References

External links

1997 births
Living people
Sportspeople from Mendoza, Argentina
Argentine footballers
Association football forwards
Argentine Primera División players
Torneo Federal A players
Club de Gimnasia y Esgrima La Plata footballers
Gimnasia y Esgrima de Mendoza footballers
San Martín de Tucumán footballers